Suecoceras is an endoceratid (a kind of nautiloid cephalopod) that lived during the Middle Ordovician. It is characterised by a long, straight, slender shell with a slightly expanded tip that curves slightly downwards.

The shell is compressed from side to side in the humped apical portion, but circular in the rest. The siphuncle is proportionally large, 1/3 to 1/2 the shell diameter; ventral at the beginning, becoming subventral in the adult portion. Septal necks are holochoanitic to slightly maxichaonitic, extending back to the previous septum and sometimes beyond. Endocones are long and slender, with a narrow tube running down the middle.

The siphuncle takes up the entire apex, but is not swollen as in Chazyoceras or Nanno.

Distribution 
Fossils of the genius have been found in:
 Karmberg Formation, Tasmania, Australia
 Kandle Formation, Estonia
 Vaidlenai Formation, Lithuania
 Segerstad and Seby Limestones, Sweden
 Rochdale Formation, New York state

References

Further reading 
 Teichert, C. 1964. Endoceratoidea; Treatise on Invertebrate Paleontology, Part K, Geological Society of America and Univ. Kansas Press
 Moore, Raymond C., Lalicker, Cecil G., & Fischer, Alfred G. 1952. Invertebrate Fossils. McGraw-Hill, New York. Page 355
 R. Ruedemann. 1906. Cephalopoda of the Beekmantown and Chazy formations of the Champlain Basin. Bulletin of the New York State Museum, Paleontology 14:389-611

Nautiloids
Ordovician cephalopods
Tremadocian
Floian
Dapingian
Darriwilian
Ordovician Australia
Fossils of Australia
Paleontology in Tasmania
Ordovician cephalopods of Europe
Paleozoic Estonia
Fossils of Estonia
Paleozoic Lithuania
Fossils of Lithuania
Ordovician Sweden
 
Ordovician cephalopods of North America
Ordovician geology of New York (state)
Paleontology in New York (state)
Fossil taxa described in 1896